Leonard Louis "Lenny" McBrowne (January 24, 1933 – October 4, 1980) was an American jazz drummer. He was a prolific hard bop drummer with a recording career that started in the 1950s and ended in the mid 1970s. As a bandleader he fronted Lenny McBrowne and the Four Souls, which released two albums in 1960. A disciple of Max Roach, McBrowne was often compared to Chico Hamilton due to the "suavely exotic tendencies of his solo work". Among McBrowne's own disciples is avant-garde drummer Andrew Cyrille.

Life and career
Leonard Louis McBrowne was born in Brooklyn, New York City, on January 24, 1933. Influenced by his father Arnold, who was a drummer, Lenny took up drums at a young age, playing in street marching bands between ages 12 and 15, while also taking lessons on the bass. Having finished high school in 1951, he studied under Max Roach (for one year) and Sticks Evans.

McBrowne began his professional career in Pete Brown's group, which featured Paul Bley. He also played with Randy Weston and Cecil Payne in various Brooklyn clubs, and with Paul Bley's Trio in Montreal, Quebec. In 1956 he played with Tony Scott in New York, and continued performing with Paul Bley in a college tour that led to his relocation to California. His first West Coast dates included the likes of Billie Holiday, Sonny Stitt, Harold Land, Benny Golson, Curtis Fuller, Fred Katz and Sonny Rollins. In 1959, McBrowne formed his own group, The Four Souls, with pianist Terry Trotter, bassist Herbie Lewis, tenor saxophonist and composer Daniel Jackson, and trumpeter Donald Sleet. Between January and March 1960, the band recorded their debut album Lenny McBrowne and the 4 Souls, released by Pacific Jazz Records. Shortly after they relocated to New York, where they recorded their second and final album Eastern Lights on October 13, 1960, with Jimmy Bond on bass and Cannonball Adderley as producer and supervisor. Notably, McBrowne introduced bassist Charlie Haden to Ornette Coleman, having previously introduced him to Paul Bley. Two pieces from Eastern Lights were released as a single by Riverside.

McBrowne and his band received coverage from the leading jazz magazines, including High Fidelity, Billboard, Metronome and Stereo Review. The group was described as "a highly close-knit and well-rehearsed combo" with "fluid and competent soloing". After the dissolution of the band, McBrowne free-lanced with Sal Salvador, Chris Connor and Carmen McRae.

In the 1960s, he played with Sarah Vaughan, Lambert, Hendricks & Bavan, Randy Weston, Booker Ervin, Ray Bryant, Teddy Wilson, and he toured Japan with Thelonious Monk. In the second half of the 1960s, McBrowne played primarily with Ervin's band. He then relocated to San Francisco and began to perform with Kenny Burrell on a regular basis until 1976, when he made his last recording.

Discography

As leader
 1960 : Lenny McBrowne and the 4 Souls (Pacific Jazz)
 1960 : Eastern Lights (Riverside)

As sideman
With Billie Holiday
Lady Sings the Blues (Clef, 1956)

With Tony Scott
The Touch of Tony Scott (RCA Victor, 1956)

With Paul Bley
Solemn Meditation (GNP Crescendo, 1957)

With Fred Katz
Fred Katz and his Jammers (Decca, 1959)

With Sonny Stitt
The Hard Swing (Verve, 1959)
Sonny Stitt Swings the Most (Verve, 1959)
So Doggone Good (Prestige, 1972)

With Randy Weston
Randy (Bakton, 1963)
Blues (Trip Jazz, 1974)
Berkshire Blues (Freedom, 1977)
Monterey '66 (Verve, 1994)

With Sonny Criss
Up, Up and Away (Prestige, 1967)
Saturday Morning (Xanadu, 1975)

With Teddy Edwards
It's All Right! (Prestige, 1967)

With Booker Ervin
Structurally Sound (Pacific Jazz, 1967)
Booker 'n' Brass (Pacific Jazz, 1967)
The In Between (Blue Note, 1968)

With Barry Harris
Luminescence! (Prestige, 1967)

With Houston Person
Trust in Me (Prestige, 1967)

With Pat Martino
East! (Prestige, 1968)

With Charles McPherson
From This Moment On! (Prestige, 1968)

With Thelonious Monk
Monk in Tokyo (Far East, 1970)

With Kenny Burrell
'Round Midnight (Fantasy, 1972)
Both Feet on the Ground (Fantasy, 1973)
Up the Street, 'Round the Corner, Down the Block (Fantasy, 1974)
Prime: Live at the Downtown Room (HighNote, 1976 [2009])
Stormy Monday (Fantasy, 1978)

With Red Garland
The Quota (MPS, 1971 [1973])

With Jon Hendricks
Tell Me the Truth (Xanadu, 1975)

With Sam Noto
Entrance (Xanadu, 1975)

References

External links
"Lenny McBrowne". Discogs. Retrieved September 24, 2015.

1933 births
1980 deaths
African-American drummers
American jazz drummers
American jazz bandleaders
Hard bop drummers
Musicians from Brooklyn
Riverside Records artists
20th-century American drummers
American male drummers
Jazz musicians from New York (state)
20th-century American male musicians
American male jazz musicians
20th-century African-American musicians